Lawrence McMahon (18 January 1929 – 16 February 2006) was an Irish Fine Gael politician who served both as a Teachta Dála (TD) and as a Senator.

McMahon was first elected to Dáil Éireann at a by-election in 1970 in the Dublin County South constituency, following the resignation of Fianna Fáil TD Kevin Boland. He held the seat at the 1973 general election. At the 1977 general election, he was returned for Dublin County Mid, and after a further revision of constituency boundaries, he was elected as TD for Dublin South-West at the general elections in 1981 and February 1982. He lost his seat at the November 1982 general election.

From 1983 to 1992, he served as a member of Seanad Éireann, elected on the Labour Panel.

References

1929 births
2006 deaths
Councillors of Dublin County Council
Fine Gael TDs
Members of the 19th Dáil
Members of the 20th Dáil
Members of the 21st Dáil
Members of the 22nd Dáil
Members of the 23rd Dáil
Members of the 17th Seanad
Members of the 18th Seanad
Members of the 19th Seanad
Fine Gael senators